Kouame Autonne Kouadio (born 22 September 2000) is an Emirati footballer who currently plays for Al Ain.

Career statistics

Club

Notes

References

External links

2000 births
Living people
Ivorian footballers
Ivorian expatriate footballers
Association football defenders
UAE Pro League players
ASEC Mimosas players
Khor Fakkan Sports Club players
Al Ain FC players
Expatriate footballers in the United Arab Emirates
Ivorian expatriate sportspeople in the United Arab Emirates